Edward 'Ted' Walton (born 1949) is an Australian former rugby league footballer who played in the 1970s in Sydney's NSWRFL competition.

Playing career
Walton was a St. George lock forward who was graded in 1969. He went on to play three seasons of first grade with the Dragons between 1970-1972. His peak year was 1971, when he was promoted from reserve grade by coach Jack Gibson to feature in the 1971 Grand Final and scored a try in that match. 

He joined Western Suburbs for one full season in 1973. Walton retired from first grade league in early 1974 after receiving a serious head injury in a trial match.

References

1949 births
Living people
St. George Dragons players
Western Suburbs Magpies players
Australian rugby league players
Rugby league locks